Charlotte Swenson Memorial Bible Training School (CSMBTS) was started on 8 July 1926 in Rajahmundry, a town in Andhra Pradesh, India.

Background
Blenda Charlotte Swenson a graduate of Bethany College (Lindsborg, Kansas) was deputed by the Lutheran Mission Board to go out to India as a Zenana Sister.  During her work in India at Rajahmundry, she envisioned the establishment of a Bible Training School for Christian women where they would be prepared as teachers of the Bible in Hindu homes.

Administration
The present principal of this school is Rev. B. Subhashini.

References
Notes

Further reading

Christian seminaries and theological colleges in India
Schools in East Godavari district
Education in Rajahmundry
Educational institutions established in 1926
1926 establishments in India